Baljit Singh Khakh is a British neuroscientist and Professor of Physiology and Neurobiology at the University of California, Los Angeles.

Education and career
Baljit Khakh completed his Ph.D. at University of Cambridge in 1995 in the laboratory of Patrick PA Humphrey. He then completed postdoctoral fellowships first in the laboratory of Graeme Henderson at the University of Bristol, then in the laboratories of Henry A. Lester and Norman Davidson at California Institute of Technology. In 2001, Khakh joined the faculty as a Group Leader at the MRC Laboratory of Molecular Biology. In 2006, Khakh moved to the University of California, Los Angeles and is now Professor of Physiology and Neurobiology. In 2013, Khakh was named a Fellow of the Royal Society of Biology as well as awarded the National Institutes of Health Director's Pioneer Award. In 2018, he was awarded the Paul G. Allen Distinguished Investigator Award. In 2019, Khakh received a R35 Outstanding Investigator Award from NINDS.

Research
Khakh's research has focused on the regulation and role of astrocytes in the brain. His group is particularly well known for working on ion channels that are involved in regulating astrocyte function.

Major publications

Tong X, Ao Y... Khakh BS (2014). Astrocyte Kir4.1 ion channel deficits contribute to neuronal dysfunction in Huntington's disease model mice. Nature Neuroscience. 17(5): pgs. 694-703
Shigetomi E, Tong X... Khakh BS (2012). TRPA1 channels regulate astrocyte resting calcium and inhibitory synapse efficacy through GAT-3. Nature Neuroscience. 15(1): pgs. 70-80
Khakh BS, Alan North R (2006). P2X receptors as cell-surface ATP sensors in health and disease. Nature. 442(7102): pgs. 527-532
Khakh BS, Bao XR... Lester HA (1999). Neuronal P2X transmitter-gated cation channels change their ion selectivity in seconds. Nature Neuroscience. 2(4): pgs. 322-330
Khakh BS, Proctor WR... Lester HA (1999). Allosteric control of gating and kinetics at P2X4 receptor channels. Journal of Neuroscience. 19(17): pgs. 7289-7299

References

Alumni of the University of Cambridge
David Geffen School of Medicine at UCLA faculty
British neuroscientists